Korkrirk Petchkongthong is a professional footballer from Thailand. He currently plays for Sriracha in the Thailand Premier League.

See also
Football in Thailand
List of football clubs in Thailand

References

External links
Profile at Thaipremierleague.co.th

Living people
Korkrirk Petchkongthong
1987 births
Association football midfielders
Korkrirk Petchkongthong